Minṭaqah (plural  manāṭiq ) is a first-level administrative division in Saudi Arabia and Chad and for a second-level administrative division in several other Arab countries. It is often translated as region or district, but the literal meaning is "region", "area", or even simply "place".

Usage
First-level administrative divisions

 Regions of Chad (top-level)
 Regions of Saudi Arabia (top-level, above governorates)

Second-level administrative divisions
 Areas of Kuwait (second-level, below governorates)
 Regions of Bahrain (formerly, top-level, replaced by governorates)
 Regions of Oman (formerly, top-level, alongside governorates, now only governorates)
 Districts of Syria (second-level, below governorates) - A mintaqah in Syria was formerly called qadaa.
 Districts of Israel (top-level)

References

Types of administrative division